Alex Larsen (born July 29, 1986), who performs under the pseudonym Kid Twist, is a battle rapper and author.  He is known for his humour, rebuttals and hairstyle. He is from Toronto. Kid Twist first gained notoriety in 2007, when he battled at the World Rap Championships.  He was the first King of the Dot champion. Kid Twist graduated from York University with a BA in creative writing and is working on the draft of his second novel. He co-wrote the loosely autobiographical film Bodied, from director Joseph Kahn and producer Eminem, which premiered at the 2017 Toronto International Film Festival. At the festival, it won the People's Choice Award: Midnight Madness. In January 2018, it was acquired by YouTube for a theatrical release and distribution.

References

External links
 Official website
 King of the Dot website

21st-century Canadian rappers
Canadian male rappers
Living people
1986 births
21st-century Canadian male musicians